Kim In-tae (born July 3, 1994) is a South Korean professional baseball outfielder for the Doosan Bears of the KBO League. He graduated from Bugil High School and was selected for the Doosan Bears by a draft in 2013 (2nd draft, 1st round).

References

External links 
 Career statistics and player information from the KBO League
 Kim In-tae at Doosan Bears Baseball Club

1994 births
Living people
Sportspeople from Daegu
Baseball outfielders
KBO League outfielders
Doosan Bears players